The Apulian regional election of 1995 took place on 23 April 1995.

For the first time the President of the Region was directly elected by the people, although the election was not yet binding and the President-elect could have been replaced during the term.

Salvatore Distaso (the candidate of the centre-right coalition) was elected President of the Region, defeating Luigi Ferrara Mirenzi (Italian People's Party) by a slim margin.

Results

Elections in Apulia
1995 elections in Italy